This is a list of museums in Vanuatu.

Museums in Vanuatu 

National Museum of Vanuatu
Vanuatu Cultural Centre

See also 
 List of museums

External links 	

 
Vanuatu
Vanuatu

Museums
Museums